The Rolls-Royce AE 2100 is a turboprop developed by Allison Engine Company, now part of Rolls-Royce North America. The engine was originally known as the GMA 2100, when Allison was a division of former corporate parent General Motors.

Development
On July 11, 1989, Saab-Scania A.B. selected the GMA 2100 to power its new Saab 2000, a 50-seat stretch of the Saab 340 turboprop, in a USD$500 million dollar deal. In July 1990, Industri Pesawat Terbang Nusantara (IPTN) of Indonesia picked the GMA 2100 as the engine for the twin-engine N-250 regional airliner. Flight testing with a  Dowty R373 propeller on a Lockheed P-3 Orion testbed aircraft began on August 23, 1990 and finished after over 50 hours of flight and ground testing.

The GMA 2100D3 became the powerplant for the Lockheed Martin C-130J Super Hercules. It made its first test flight on March 19, 1994, which was conducted by Marshall Aerospace on a Lockheed C-130K Hercules testbed leased from the Royal Air Force. Testing ended in June 1994 after 47 flight hours. The engine powered the initial flight of the C-130J aircraft on April 5, 1996. By April 1997, the D3 variant had received Federal Aviation Administration (FAA) type certification. 2,000 of the D3 variants have been delivered as of 2018.

The engine's C variant was certified on December 20, 1993. It powered the N-250 prototype's first flight on August 10, 1995, but the N-250 aircraft program was postponed indefinitely in the late 1990s due to the Asian financial crisis.

In June 1997, the AE 2100 was selected by Lockheed Martin and Alenia to power the C-27J Spartan tactical airlifter. In October 2015, Alenia announced plans to use a  uprated version of the AE 2100 as the baseline engine by 2017.

Design

A derivative of the Allison AE 1107C-Liberty (Rolls-Royce T406) turboshaft engine, the AE 2100 shares the same high-pressure core as that engine, as does the Rolls-Royce AE 3007 turbofan. The AE 2100 is a two-shaft design, and it was the first to use dual FADECs (full authority digital engine control) to control both engine and propeller, allowing both to be adjusted with a single lever. There are four production variants of the engine: the civil AE 2100A, and the military variants which include the AE 2100D2/D2A, AE 2100D3, AE 2100J and AE 2100P.

The AE 2100 inherited the Allison T56's 14-stage axial compressor design, but the inlet and the stator for the first five stages have variable blades. The annular combustor has 16 air-blast fuel injection nozzles. The turbine that drives the compressor has two stages, with the first stage using single-crystal blades. A free power turbine with two stages drives the propeller through an inner shaft and a gearbox. The engine has replaceable steel blades and vanes, which are more reliable but heavier than titanium.

The engine uses six-bladed, all-composite blade Dowty propellers, including the model R381 on the Saab 2000, R414 on the ShinMaywa US-2, R384 on the IPTN N-250, and R391 on the C-130J military transport and the LM-100J civil-certified version of the C-130J. The gearbox has a reduction ratio of about 14 and a mean time before unscheduled removal (MTBUR) of over 35,000 hours.

Variants and applications
AE 2100A
 Lockheed P-3 Orion (testbed)
 Saab 2000
AE 2100C
 IPTN N-250 (prototype only)
AE 2100D2A
 Alenia C-27J Spartan
AE 2100D3
 Lockheed C-130K Hercules (testbed)
 Lockheed Martin C-130J Super Hercules
 Lockheed Martin LM-100J
AE 2100F
 A variant proposed in 1995 and paired with Dowty R394 propellers to retrofit the Allison T56-powered Lockheed C-130 models E through H and Lockheed L-100-30, at a price after engine/propeller trade-in of USD$11 million per aircraft.
AE 2100G
AE 2100H
A variant offered in 1996 for Dassault Aviation's proposed Atlantic Third Generation (ATL3G) maritime patrol aircraft (MPA).
AE 2100J
 A hybrid of the AE 2100A and AE 2100D3, sporting the torque-meter and interconnecting struts from the AE 2100A and the gearbox-mounted accessory gearbox from the AE 2100D3; also uses a stronger reduction gearbox, a Dowty six-bladed propeller for higher loads, and modified inlet and bypass section positioning to mitigate seawater ingestion; powers the ShinMaywa US-2.
AE 2100P
 Saab 2000 AEW&C
AE 2100SD-7
A variant proposed in 1994 for the European Future Large Aircraft (which eventually became the Airbus A400M), with the required power increase from  estimated to cost USD$600 million.

Specifications (AE 2100D3)

See also

References

Bibliography

External links

 AE 2100 product page at rolls-royce.com
 Rolls-royce.com
 Lockheed Martin C-130J specification booklet

1990s turboprop engines
Rolls-Royce aircraft gas turbine engines